A silylenoid in organosilicon chemistry is a type of chemical compound with the general structure  where R is any organic residue, X a halogen and M a metal. Silylenoids are the silicon pendants of carbenoid and both compounds have carbene or silylene like properties.

Silylenoids are encountered as reactive intermediates in chemical reactions. A stable silylenoid can be prepared by reaction of a fluorobromosilane with a silyllithium compound in THF :

(t-Bu2MeSi)2SiFBr + t-Bu2MeSiLi/THF → (t-Bu2MeSi)2SiFLi.3THF + t-Bu2MeSiBr

In this silylenoid the silicon atom is bonded with three substituents and not the usual four. X-ray diffraction shows that the Si-F bond with 170 pm is longer than usual for fluorosilanes. The F-Li bond is ionic with an estimated (in silico) positive charge of 0.88 residing on lithium and a negative charge of 0.74 on fluorine making it a (t-Bu2MeSi)2SiF−, Li+.3THF salt. The Si-F bond is likewise polarized with only 10% of the charge on silicon.

When the silylenoid is irradiated or heated a disilene forms probably via a silylene intermediate. With electrophiles it reacts as an anion and with organolithium compounds it reacts as a silylene.

References
  Synthesis, Molecular Structure, and Reactivity of the Isolable Silylenoid with a Tricoordinate Silicon Gregory Molev, Dmitry Bravo-Zhivotovskii, Miriam Karni, Boris Tumanskii, Mark Botoshansky, and Yitzhak Apeloig J. Am. Chem. Soc.; 2006; 128(9) pp 2784 – 2785; Abstract

Organosilicon compounds